The Phleogenaceae are a family of fungi in the order Atractiellales. The family currently contains 7 genera and 54 species.

References

External links

Atractiellales
Basidiomycota families